John Cronin (1923 – 30 July 1992) was an Irish Gaelic footballer who played for club sides Collins and Milltown/Castlemaine and at inter-county level with the Cork and Kerry senior football teams.

Career
Cronin first came to Gaelic football prominence in a number of army tournaments. His performances saw him join his brother Jimmy on the Cork senior team. Cronin won a Munster Championship in his first full season on the team in 1949, before being named captain of the team the following year. He claimed a second Munster Championship title as well as a National League title in his last year with the team in 1952. Cronin joined the Kerry senior team in 1953 and won an All-Ireland title in his debut season. During his four-year tenure with the team, he won three consecutive provincial titles before winning a second All-Ireland title in 1955. At club level, Cronin won three County Championships with Collins Barracks, while he also lined out for Milltown/Castlemaine.

Personal life and death
Born in Milltown, County Kerry, Cronin joined the Irish Army at the age of 18 and was a Quarter Master Sergeant attached to the Military Hospital at Collins Barracks in Cork. He left the Army in 1957 after which he spent three years in the Rhodesian Army. He subsequently lived in London before returning to Milltown in 1974.

Cronin died at Tralee General Hospital on 30 July 1992.

Honours
Collins
Cork Senior Football Championship: 1949, 1951, 1953

Cork
Munster Senior Football Championship: 1949, 1952
National Football League: 1951-52

Kerry
All-Ireland Senior Football Championship: 1953, 1955
Munster Senior Football Championship: 1953, 1954, 1955

References

1923 births
1992 deaths
Collins Gaelic footballers
Milltown/Castlemaine Gaelic footballers
Cork inter-county Gaelic footballers
Kerry inter-county Gaelic footballers
Irish Army officers
Irish expatriates in England
Rhodesian Army personnel by regiment